Prednisolone sodium phosphate is a synthetic glucocorticoid corticosteroid and a corticosteroid ester.

References

External links
 

Corticosteroid esters
Glucocorticoids